Deshmukh Balajirao Gopalrao is a politician and a former member of the Indian National Congress, and son of Gopalrao Gorthekar Deshmukh. He was a Three times Member of the Maharashtra Legislative Assembly from the Bhokar constituency.

He Contested an Assembly election against Shankarrao Chavan in 1978 from Bhokar as Indian National Congress Candidate.

References

Year of birth missing (living people)
Living people
Indian National Congress politicians from Maharashtra